Asterococcus is a genus of green algae in the order Chlamydomonadales.

References

External links

Scientific references

Scientific databases

 AlgaeBase
 AlgaTerra database
 Index Nominum Genericorum

Chlamydomonadales genera
Chlamydomonadales